Wasi or WASI may refer to:

 Al-Wāsiʿ, one of the names of God in Islam, meaning The Omnipresent
 Washi, Osmanabad, a panchayat village in Osmanabad District, Maharashtra, India
 Wasi, Sulawesi, a village in Donggala Regency on the island of Sulawesi, Indonesia
 WebAssembly System Interface

See also
 Vasi (disambiguation)